25 Aquarii (abbreviated 25 Aqr) is a single star in the equatorial constellation of Aquarius. 25 Aquarii is the modern Flamsteed designation; in the past it held the designation 6 Pegasi. It also bears the Bayer designation of d Aquarii. It is located near the border with the modern Pegasus constellation. Although faint at an apparent visual magnitude of +5.09, it is bright enough to be viewed from suburban skies. The visual magnitude of the star is diminished by 0.09 from extinction caused by intervening gas and dust.

The spectrum of this star matches a stellar classification of K0 III, with the luminosity class of III indicating that this is a giant star that has evolved away from the main sequence after exhausting the supply of hydrogen at its core. It belongs to a population known as clump giants and hence is generating energy through the nuclear fusion of helium at the core. The outer envelope has expanded to 11 times the radius of the Sun and it is radiating 54 times the Sun's luminosity. This energy is being emitted from the stellar atmosphere at an effective temperature of 4,721 K, causing it to glow with the orange hue of a K-type star.

References

External links
 Image 25 Aquarii

K-type giants
Horizontal-branch stars
Aquarius (constellation)
Aquarii, d
BD+01 4517
Aquarii, 025
206067
106944
8277